Joissains is a surname. Notable people with the surname include:

Alain Joissains, French politician, Mayor of Aix-en-Provence from 1978 to 1983
Maryse Joissains (born 1942), French politician
Sophie Joissains (born 1969), French politician